The British Compressed Air Society (BCAS) is the compressed air and vacuum trade association in the United Kingdom. It has membership for Manufacturers, Distributors, Suppliers and End-Users of compressed air equipment and systems.

History
BCAS was formed in 1930 and represents manufacturers, distributors and users of compressed air and vacuum equipment. It became a company on 1 July 1998.

Members
The organization is situated near to Marylebone High Street, south of Regent's Park in Marylebone.

Members include a diverse set of firms and organizations, including many of the following:
 Major Manufacturers & Importers based in the UK
 Major UK Distributors, Resellers and Suppliers

Function
The BCAS plays a key role in setting standards and codes of practice within the industry.  BCAS also lobbies the UK government on behalf of UK industry and business, e.g. to outlaw non-compliant products.  It works with a range of organisations and government departments, including the Health and Safety Executive, standards agencies, and training initiatives.   

It publishes statistical information on the state of the compressed air equipment UK market.

See also
 British Fluid Power Association - similar organisation for hydraulic equipment

References

External links
 Official website
 Pneurop website

Pneumatics
Industrial gases
Compressed air power
Organizations established in 1930
1930 establishments in the United Kingdom
Trade associations based in the United Kingdom
Organisations based in the City of Westminster